Men's collegiate basketball in particular, and intercollegiate athletics in general is fragmented in the Philippines.

The National Collegiate Athletic Association (Philippines) and University Athletic Association of the Philippines are the leagues that receive the most attention, owing to their national television coverage, and also since all of their schools are from Metro Manila.

Champions per season

Championships per school

Notes

References

Champions
College champions